Ricardo Cano (born 27 December 1951) is a former professional tennis player from Argentina. Most of his tennis success was in doubles. During his career, he won four doubles titles and finished runner-up six times.

Cano participated in 23 Davis Cup ties for Argentina from 1971 to 1982, posting a 14–13 record in singles and a 9–7 record in doubles.

Career finals

Doubles (4 titles, 6 runner-ups)

External links
 
 
 

Argentine male tennis players
Tennis players from Buenos Aires
Living people
1951 births